The men's team sprint competition at the 2006 Asian Games was held on 10 December at the Aspire Hall 1.

Schedule
All times are Arabia Standard Time (UTC+03:00)

Results
Legend
DNS — Did not start

Qualifying

Finals

Bronze

Gold

References

External links 
Qualification Results
Finals Results

Track Men Team sprint